Let the People Sing is a 1939 novel by the British writer J. B. Priestley. It examines civic politics and corruption in the small English town of Dunbury, where the music hall is due to be closed. It was adapted into a 1942 film Let the People Sing.

Bibliography
 Baxendale, John. Priestley's England: J.B. Priestley and English culture. Manchester University Press, 2007.

1939 British novels
Novels by J. B. Priestley
Heinemann (publisher) books
British novels adapted into films